Rukhsana Shah is a Pakistani politician who had been a Member of the Provincial Assembly of Sindh, from 2008 to May 2018.

Early life and education
She was born on 1 June 1959 in Thatta.

She has earned the degree of Bachelor of Education, Master of Arts in Economics, and Master of Arts in Islamic Culture, all from the University of Sindh.

Political career

She was elected to the Provincial Assembly of Sindh as a candidate of Pakistan Peoples Party (PPP) on a reserved seat for women in 2008 Pakistani general election.

She was re-elected to the Provincial Assembly of Sindh as a candidate of PPP on a reserved seat for women in 2013 Pakistani general election.

References

Living people
Sindh MPAs 2013–2018
Sindh MPAs 2008–2013
1959 births
Pakistan People's Party politicians